The Tula Kingdom is a Nigerian traditional state in northern Nigeria with its headquarters in Wange, Kaltungo, Local Government Area  Gombe. It comprises three districts: Yiri, Baule and Wange, and is located 101 kilometres away from the Gombe State capital and 15 kilometres off the Adamawa-Yola highway. The Present Mai or 
King Dr Abubakar Buba Atare II is the paramount Ruler and Chairman Tula Chiefdom.

Tula people
The Tula people are known warriors, as The saying "Tula Maza Ba Tsoro" it is evident that Tula were in a Battle with the people of Misau Emirate present day Bauchi State, a Jihad led by the 'Emir' of Misau Mai Sale who was not only defeated but had his head Decapitated. His remains were buried at Sukube Baule in 1887 During the Reign of Mai Baule Wumne. Tula people happened to be the only people of Ngazargamu/ Bornu Empire descent who fought a commander of the Sokoto Caliphate and defeated the caliphate's Army.  Tula People were never defeated on a battle ground, Tula was among the only few places that the founder of the Sokoto Caliphate, Usman Dan Fodio's army couldn't conquer During his Jihad.

History
The disunity among the three districts that the Tula Chiefdom is composed delayed the creation til 2001; it was created out of the Kaltungo Chiefdom under the administration of Abubakar Habu Hashidu, the then Governor of Gombe State by act of the Gombe State House of Assembly. Dr Kokiya Atare Buba was appointed the 'Mai', or King of the newly created chiefdom, which consists of 13 districts and the new emir was presented with His staff of office in March 2003 at Kaltin where his tomb resides. Dr K A Buba took the regnal name Dr K A Buba (The 1st Mai of Tula). On 13 December 2009 Dr K A Buba passed away leaving the stool vacant, 8 days later his 22-year-old son Abubakar Buba Atare was appointed to succeed him making him the Youngest Monarch in recent memory. He took the regnal name Aubakar Buba Atare II (The Second Mai of Tula). In January 2011, the then Executive Governor of Gombe State Mohammed Danjuma Goje upgraded the Tula Chiefdom to a first class status  In May 2017, Mai Abubakar  Atare donated land so a golf course could be built in the Tula region.

Tula Battlefield 
The battle field is located in Tula at the Kaltungo Local Government in Gombe State. This is an historical site for the Gombe people because this is the ground where the British attacked and conquered the people of Tula under the command of Captain Calyle

The attack on the Tula people by the Colonialist was caused as a result of their rejection for a peaceful coexistence amongst the surrounding ethnic groups. By 1908, the other ethnic groups reported Tula to the then Colonial Resident Officer in Bauchi that they were terrorizing them. This brought the Colonial masters to intervene in the situation and they tried to settle the matter in order to bring peace amongst the surrounding communities but the Tulas rejected any peaceful reconciliation by the Colonial masters.The Tula people were so confident about their abilities to fight because no ethnic group around them has ever conquered them. They were so confident that they also stole the gun of the Colonial master who came for the peace talk and rejected every peace talk and offer. This made the Colonial masters angry for their actions, so a war was waged on the people of Tula which was led by Captain Calye. The people of Tula thought fighting with the Colonist was like every other wars they fought and won but this war brought about the conquest of Tula chiefdom which was now relegated to answer to the Kaltungo chiefdom which used to be a chiefdom in Tangale/Waja

Tourist Centres In Tula 
The Tula Cave

Rulers
Dr K Atare Buba (2001 - 2009)
Abubakar Buba Atare (2009 till date )

Title Holders
Some other positions include:
 District Head of Baule
 Ibrahim Hassan Musa

 District Head of Wange
 Abdullahi Aska Shamaki

 Sarkin Hurumin Tula
 Mal. Abdulrahman Barkindo

 Jagaban Tula 
 Mal. Munnir Hassan Dankwambo

 Ciroman  Labaru of Tula
 Mal. Naseer Mohammad Shuaib

 District Head of Yiri
 Yerima Doma

 Jakadan Tula
 R B Lamay

 Galadiman Tula 
 Alhaji Yahaya W Yahya

 Ciroman Tula 
 Ibrahim Hassan

References

External links
 Tula Community Development Association website

Nigerian traditional states
2001 establishments in Nigeria
Gombe State
Emirates
Non-sovereign monarchy